Chen Lien-hung, born 13 September 1973 in Tainan, Taiwan, is a Taiwanese former baseball player who  played for Chinatrust Whales and Uni-President Lions of Chinese Professional Baseball League. 

  On August  4, 2013, he was named the manager for the Uni-President Lions. On February 16, 2015, Chen was named the hitting coach of the Uni-President Lions. On January 5, 2018, he was named the Second Team Coach for the Fubon Guardians .

Konami Cup
Chen hit two home runs against China Stars in Konami Cup Asia Series 2007: one two-runs and one grand slam. His younger brother, Chen Chin-feng of La New Bears, also hit a two-runs home run and a grand slam against China Stars in Konami Cup Asia Series 2006.

See also
Chinese Professional Baseball League
Uni-President Lions

References

1973 births
Asian Games medalists in baseball
Baseball players at the 1994 Asian Games
Living people
Baseball players from Tainan
Uni-President 7-Eleven Lions players
Asian Games bronze medalists for Chinese Taipei
Medalists at the 1994 Asian Games
Baseball outfielders
Uni-President 7-Eleven Lions managers
Uni-President 7-Eleven Lions coaches
Fubon Guardians managers